Judge Webster may refer to:

J. Stanley Webster (1877–1962), judge of the United States District Court for the Eastern District of Washington
William H. Webster (born 1924), judge of the United States District Court for the Eastern District of Missouri

See also
Justice Webster (disambiguation)